Anaparambil Joseph John (1893–1957) was an Indian freedom fighter and statesman. He was Chief Minister of Travancore-Cochin and Governor of Madras State.

Early life 

He was born in 1893, at Thalayolaparambu and had his primary education at the local school and finished his school final from Vaikom High School. After doing the degree in Law in 1919 from the Law College, Madras, he began his career as a lawyer.

The turning point in John's life came when he plunged into freedom struggle after abandoning his bright future in his profession. He was one of the founding leaders of Travancore State Congress.

He was in the forefront of the historic Abstention Movement which rocked Travancore for some time; an agitation against social injustice staged by the weaker sections and backward classes for proportionate representations in government service. He fought against Independent Travancore proposed by Sir C P Rama Swamy Iyer in 1946.

Chief Minister of Travancore-Cochin 

In the first general elections held in India in 1951–52, John was elected from Poonjar constituency to the Travancore-Cochin Legislative Assembly. The Congress formed Government with AJ John as Chief Minister in March 1952 with the support of the Travancore Tamil Nadu Congress (T.T.N.C.). With the demand for merging Kanyakumari in Tamil Nadu on 23 September 1953, the majority of the ministry lost due to the withdrawal of support from the T.T.N.C. John served as Chief Minister until March 1954, until the new cabinet was formed.

He also served as Speaker of the first Travancore Legislative Assembly in 1948 and Minister for Home, Food, Civil Supplies and Forest in Panampally Govinda Menon Ministry from 1955 to 1956.

Governor of Madras State 
John was appointed Governor of Madras State in 1956. He died in October 1957, when he was the Governor of Madras State after a sudden illness.

See also 

 T. M. Varghese
 C. Kesavan

References 

1893 births
1957 deaths
Indian National Congress politicians from Kerala
Indian anti-communists
Malayali politicians
Chief Ministers of Kerala
Governors of Tamil Nadu
Governors of Madras
Chief ministers from Indian National Congress
Travancore–Cochin MLAs 1952–1954
Travancore–Cochin MLAs 1954–1956